Mark McVeigh (born 26 January 1981) is a former professional Australian rules footballer for the Essendon Football Club in the Australian Football League. He served as the caretaker senior coach of the Greater Western Sydney Giants following the resignation of Leon Cameron in 2022.

Playing career

Essendon Football Club

Early career (1999–2004)
After having a slow start with a season high of 15 Disposals and 4 Marks, in his second season he suffered an injury and missed most of Essendons games. In McVeigh's third season however, it was clear that the game had grown on him as he stood up as an up-and-coming youngster. After playing 23 games in his third year of playing including the Grand Final against the Brisbane Lions in which Essendon lost, McVeigh had some promising stats with a consistent 11 – 18 in over half of every game he played. McVeigh also went on to play the next 3 seasons in stellar form with Essendon who reached 3 consecutive semi-finals in which McVeigh played in all.

Mid-career (2005–2008)
In the next 3 seasons McVeigh was a stand out performer for Essendon, with a high disposal & efficiency rate he was one of the club's main contributors and eventually was to become a part of the Leadership group and a role model to his younger rookies. With disposals in the high 20s and a career high of 36 disposals, McVeigh was determined to get Essendon back on track. In 2008 McVeigh suffered an injury that sidelined him for almost half the season, nevertheless he claimed 13 Brownlow votes to his name in only 14 games, McVeigh finished in the top 20.

Retirement
McVeigh retired from professional Australian Rules Football on 29 August 2012. Injuries to his hip, knee and hamstring restricted McVeigh to only three games during the 2012 season. McVeigh stated, "It's a decision that I've been to-ing and fro-ing with for about eight weeks. But I've been very fortunate to part ways with the club on really good terms," during a press conference at Windy Hill. McVeigh shared the role of Vice-Captain of the Essendon Football Club with David Hille for most of his career. McVeigh played a total of 232 games and kicked 107 goals during his successful career at Essendon.

Media career
In 2013, following his retirement, McVeigh began a media career with the Seven Network and SEN 1116.

Coaching career
He also began taking developmental coaching roles in New South Wales and Canberra. He coached the Under-16 and Under-18 NSW/ACT Rams teams in the national championships.

Greater Western Sydney
McVeigh then took a head coaching role at the Giants Academy, then transitioned into an assistant coaching role at the Greater Western Sydney Giants from 2015, serving as the defensive coach. McVeigh was appointed as the caretaker senior coach of GWS Giants until the end of the 2022 season, following the mid-season resignation of senior coach Leon Cameron. His first match in charge, in round 10, saw the Giants defeat  by 52 points.

McVeigh attracted some criticism from the media after calling out his team's performance against  in Round 20, 2022 but with a mostly unchanged side they would defeat his old club  by 27 points the following week. The club ultimately finished 16th on the ladder with a 6–16 record, its lowest finish since the 2014 AFL season. At the end of the 2022 season, McVeigh was not retained as the senior coach of the GWS Giants and was replaced by Adam Kingsley. On 10 October, McVeigh left the club.

Personal life
On 17 October 2009 McVeigh married his longtime girlfriend, Leanne Tucker. They have a daughter, Ariana, born in March 2011. Mark also had a niece, Luella (the daughter of Sydney's Jarrad McVeigh), born on 25 July 2011 but she died from heart complications barely a month later. Essendon's players wore black armbands in the match.

2016 suspension from coaching
On 12 January 2016, McVeigh was named as one of 34 past and present Essendon players found guilty over their use of illegal supplements during the 2012 AFL season. As a result, McVeigh was suspended from involvement in football for twenty-four months, which (due to back-dating and time served in provisional suspensions) saw him suspended until November 2016. The terms of the suspension meant that McVeigh was unable to continue assistant coaching role during 2016.

Statistics
 Statistics are correct to end of AFL career

|- style="background-color: #EAEAEA"
! scope="row" style="text-align:center" | 1999
|  || 10 || 9 || 2 || 5 || 44 || 17 || 61 || 13 || 4 || 0.2 || 0.6 || 4.9 || 1.9 || 6.8 || 1.4 || 0.4
|-
! scope="row" style="text-align:center" | 2000
|  || 10 || 1 || 0 || 1 || 2 || 0 || 2 || 1 || 1 || 0.0 || 1.0 || 2.0 || 0.0 || 2.0 || 1.0 || 1.0
|- style="background-color: #EAEAEA"
! scope="row" style="text-align:center" | 2001
|  || 10 || 23 || 18 || 11 || 173 || 74 || 247 || 55 || 57 || 0.8 || 0.5 || 7.5 || 3.2 || 10.7 || 2.4 || 2.5
|-
! scope="row" style="text-align:center" | 2002
|  || 10 || 24 || 7 || 13 || 223 || 68 || 291 || 73 || 60 || 0.3 || 0.5 || 9.3 || 2.8 || 12.1 || 4.6 || 2.5
|- style="background-color: #EAEAEA"
! scope="row" style="text-align:center" | 2003
|  || 10 || 24 || 9 || 7 || 210 || 78 || 288 || 67 || 64 || 0.4 || 0.3 || 8.8 || 3.2 || 12.0 || 2.8 || 2.7
|-
! scope="row" style="text-align:center" | 2004
|  || 10 || 18 || 3 || 1 || 155 || 104 || 259 || 55 || 58 || 0.2 || 0.1 || 8.6 || 5.8 || 14.4 || 3.1 || 3.2
|- style="background-color: #EAEAEA"
! scope="row" style="text-align:center" | 2005
|  || 10 || 21 || 7 || 8 || 211 || 90 || 301 || 84 || 53 || 0.3 || 0.4 || 10.0 || 4.3 || 14.3 || 4.0 || 2.5
|-
! scope="row" style="text-align:center" | 2006
|  || 10 || 21 || 9 || 11 || 216 || 91 || 307 || 77 || 62 || 0.4 || 0.5 || 10.3 || 4.3 || 14.6 || 3.7 || 3.0
|- style="background-color: #EAEAEA"
! scope="row" style="text-align:center" | 2007
|  || 10 || 21 || 20 || 16 || 270 || 116 || 386 || 104 || 60 || 1.0 || 0.8 || 12.9 || 5.5 || 18.4 || 5.0 || 2.9
|-
! scope="row" style="text-align:center" | 2008
|  || 10 || 14 || 14 || 7 || 219 || 96 || 315 || 61 || 44 || 1.0 || 0.5 || 15.6 || 6.9 || 22.5 || 4.4 || 3.1
|- style="background-color: #EAEAEA"
! scope="row" style="text-align:center" | 2009
|  || 10 || 12 || 5 || 3 || 110 || 81 || 191 || 33 || 35 || 0.4 || 0.2 || 9.2 || 6.8 || 15.9 || 2.8 || 2.9
|-
! scope="row" style="text-align:center" | 2010
|  || 10 || 18 || 7 || 4 || 177 || 92 || 269 || 52 || 52 || 0.4 || 0.2 || 9.8 || 5.1 || 14.9 || 2.9 || 2.9
|- style="background-color: #EAEAEA"
! scope="row" style="text-align:center" | 2011
|  || 10 || 23 || 5 || 7 || 252 || 107 || 359 || 65 || 75 || 0.2 || 0.3 || 11.0 || 4.6 || 15.6 || 2.8 || 3.3
|-
! scope="row" style="text-align:center" | 2012
|  || 10 || 3 || 1 || 0 || 28 || 11 || 39 || 15 || 3 || 0.3 || 0.0 || 9.3 || 3.7 || 13.0 || 5.0 || 1.0
|- class="sortbottom"
! colspan=3| Career
! 232
! 107
! 94
! 2290
! 1025
! 3315
! 755
! 628
! 0.5
! 0.4
! 9.9
! 4.4
! 14.3
! 3.3
! 2.7
|}

References

External links

Profile on Official Essendon Website

1981 births
Living people
Australian rules footballers from New South Wales
Australian people of Irish descent
Essendon Football Club players
Greater Western Sydney Giants coaches
NSW/ACT Rams players
Australian sportspeople in doping cases
Bendigo Football Club players
Australia international rules football team players
People educated at St Peter's Catholic College, Tuggerah